ICOMP may refer to:
 Intel Comparative Microprocessor Performance index, an index, published by Intel, used to measure the relative performance of its microprocessors
 Initiative for a Competitive Online Marketplace a Microsoft backed lobbying group